Holger Blume (born 28 December 1973 in Lüdinghausen, North Rhine-Westphalia, West Germany) is a former German sprinter who specialised in the 100 metres.

He is the twin brother of Marc Blume. Both represented the sports club TV Wattenscheid.

Holger Blume finished seventh in 4 × 100 metres relay at the 1998 IAAF World Cup, with teammates Patrick Schneider, Manuel Milde and Marc Blume. With a personal best of 10.13 seconds, Blume is fifth on the German all-time list.

He also participated in this event at the 1996 Olympic Games, the 1999 World Championships and the 2002 IAAF World Cup without reaching the final.

Personal bests 
 100 m: 10.25 s (1999)
 200 m: 20.73 s (1999)

References 
 

1973 births
Living people
People from Lüdinghausen
Sportspeople from Münster (region)
German male sprinters
German national athletics champions
Olympic athletes of Germany
Athletes (track and field) at the 1996 Summer Olympics
German twins
Twin sportspeople